The Sydney International (formerly known as the Championship of New South Wales and New South Wales Open, with various title sponsors), formerly sponsored as the Apia International Sydney from 2012 to 2017, is a professional tennis tournament in Sydney, Australia. The tournament was played annually at the Sydney Olympic Park Tennis Centre in Sydney Olympic Park. It is one of the oldest tennis tournaments in the world, dating to 1885. The tournament did not take place 2020 and 2021 due to the ATP Cup tournament, and again in 2023 due to the United Cup.

The Sydney International is the last noted as an ATP 250 point event on the men's tour and a WTA 500 event on the women's tour. The tournament is held annually in January immediately prior to the Australian Open as a lead up tournament as part of the Australian Open Series.

History 
The model for the Sydney International was formed in 1885 when colonial officials decided there was a need to discover the best tennis player in each of the colonies and to use the tournament to assist with selection to the Australasia Davis Cup team, however the first time the tournament was played as a permanent annual event was in 1935. Between 1970 and 1989 it was part of the Grand Prix tennis circuit and a Grand Prix Super Series tournament from 1970 to 1971.

Tournament locations 
The inaugural edition of the tournament was played in May 1885 at the "Association Ground" in Moore Park, part of the Sydney Cricket Ground. In 1908 control of the tournament was handed over to the NSW Tennis Association and the event moved to its location at Double Bay. From 1922 until 1999 the event was hosted at the White City complex, close to the Sydney central business district.

Since the 2000 edition, the event was played at the Sydney Olympic Park Tennis Centre, in Sydney Olympic Park, a suburb of Western Sydney and formerly part of the suburb of Homebush Bay, which was constructed for the tennis events at the 2000 Summer Olympics. The venue consists of 15 outdoor courts and a centre court along with an administrative building, for the whole of Tennis NSW.

The tournament was not included on the men's or women's schedule for the 2020 and 2021 seasons, as the new ATP Cup took place in the same period. It was not held again in 2023 due to the United Cup took place.

Past finals

Men's singles

Women's singles

Men's doubles

Women's doubles

References

External links 

 
 ATP tournament profile
 WTA tournament profile

 
Tennis tournaments in Australia
Hard court tennis tournaments
WTA Tour
Sports competitions in Sydney
Recurring sporting events established in 1935
ATP Tour 250
1935 establishments in Australia
Tennis in New South Wales